Mark Batinick is a Republican member of the Illinois House of Representatives who represents the 97th district. The 97th district includes all or parts of Oswego, Plainfield and Shorewood.

As of July 3, 2022, Representative Batinick is a member of the following Illinois House committees:

 Health Care Licenses Committee (HHCL)
 Immigration & Human Rights Committee (SIHR)
 Insurance Committee (HINS)
 International Trade & Commerce Committee (HITC)
 Personnel & Pensions Committee (HPPN)

Mark Batinick did not run for reelection and was succeeded by Democrat Harry Benton.

References

External links
Mark Batinick for 97th State Representative campaign site
Profile at Ballotpedia

Living people
People from Plainfield, Illinois
Republican Party members of the Illinois House of Representatives
Year of birth missing (living people)
21st-century American politicians